John More (1506? – 19 January 1581), of Cannon Row, Westminster, Middlesex and Crabbet, Worth, Sussex, was an English politician. He was a Member of Parliament (MP) for Winchelsea in 1547.

References

1581 deaths
People from Worth, West Sussex
People from Westminster
English MPs 1547–1552
Year of birth uncertain
People from Winchelsea